Parvati Melton (born January 7, 1988) is an American model turned actress of Indian and German descent known for her works in Telugu and Malayalam language films. She acted with Raja in the film Vennela, which turned out to be a success. She acted in the Blockbuster Malayalam film Hallo with Mohanlal. She again shot to fame with item song "Poovai Poovai" in Telugu movie Dookudu opposite Mahesh Babu.

Biography
Parvati was born in New Jersey to a German father Sham Melton and an Indian Punjabi mother Darika Preet. She has one younger sister Ariana Sitara Melton. She is a trained Bharatanatyam dancer. She graduated from Emeryville High School and attended Vista Community College in Berkeley, California. She took part in several beauty pageants and won the Miss Teen India Bay Area pageant in 2004 and the Miss India Le Visage USA pageant in 2005. While still studying in Vista College, she was offered the lead role in the Telugu film Vennela. Although she intended to go back to school after the project, the film's success kept her away.

She married Shamsu Lalani in 2013, and subsequently retired from films.

Filmography

References

External links
 

Living people
1988 births
Actresses from New Jersey
Actresses from California
American film actresses
American people of German descent
American people of Punjabi descent
American actresses of Indian descent
American expatriate actresses in India
Actresses in Telugu cinema
Actresses in Malayalam cinema
21st-century American women
21st-century American actresses